Eddy Juan Francis, Aidi Fulangxisi (born 17 December 1990, in Shanghai) or simply Aidi, is a Chinese professional footballer who currently plays for Chinese Super League club Shanghai Shenhua.

Club career
Aidi's mother is Chinese Hakka and his father is Tanzanian. He joined Genbao Football Academy when he was ten years old. In the end of 2005, he joined Shanghai East Asia with whole Genbao Football Academy team and started his career. But after his first season, he was downsized and moved to Shanghai Shenhua. In 2008, he moved to China League Two club Suzhou Trips after unhappiness with Shanghai Shenhua, but had no appearance because of problems regarding his registration. In 2009 Suzhou Trips quit China League Two, Aidi signed on loan to Ningbo Huaao for a year. After his loan finished, he moved to China League One club Shanghai East Asia immediately, returned to the start of his football career.

On 20 January 2012, Shanghai East Asia swapped Aidi with Luis Cabezas of Chinese Super League side Dalian Aerbin. He was loaned back to Shanghai East Asia for one year in February 2012. However, he failed to establish himself within the team and made just 3 appearances (all came on as substitute) in the 2012 league season. On 8 March 2014, Aidi made his debut for Dalian Aerbin in the 2014 Chinese Super League against Hangzhou Greentown, coming on as a substitute for Zhu Xiaogang in the 77th minute.

On 29 January 2017, Portuguese club Boavista signed Aidi on a one-and-a-half year contract. This transfer is said to come through a partnership with the Chinese Football Association.

On 7 February 2018, Shanghai Greenland Shenhua announced that Aidi would join the club and play in the Chinese Super League and AFC Champions League. He would make his debut on 26 February 2018 in the Chinese FA Super Cup against Guangzhou Evergrande Taobao F.C. that ended in a 4–1 defeat. This was followed by his first league appearance for the club on 2 March 2018 against Changchun Yatai F.C. that resulted in a 1–1 draw.

International career
Aidi played 27 minutes for the China under-14 team in the 2004 AFC U-14 Championship; he is the first mixed-race player for the China national football teams at all age level. Because of his Tanzanian background, he is also available to represent Tanzania.

Career statistics 
Statistics accurate as of match played 31 December 2020.

Honours

Club
Shanghai East Asia
 China League One: 2012

Shanghai Shenhua
Chinese FA Cup: 2019

References

External links 
 
  Eddy Career Statistics

1990 births
Living people
Chinese footballers
Tanzanian footballers
Footballers from Shanghai
Shanghai Port F.C. players
Dalian Professional F.C. players
Boavista F.C. players
Shanghai Shenhua F.C. players
Chinese people of Tanzanian descent
Chinese Super League players
China League One players
China League Two players
Primeira Liga players
Association football defenders
Chinese expatriate footballers
Expatriate footballers in Portugal
Chinese expatriate sportspeople in Portugal
Black Chinese sportspeople